998 Bodea (prov. designation:  or ) is a dark background asteroid from the outer regions of the asteroid belt, approximately  in diameter. It was discovered on 6 August 1923, by astronomer Karl Reinmuth at the Heidelberg Observatory in southern Germany. The presumed C-type asteroid with an irregular shape has a rotation period of 8.6 hours. It was named after German astronomer Johann Elert Bode (1747–1826).

Orbit and classification 

Bodea is a non-family asteroid of the main belt's background population when applying the hierarchical clustering method to its proper orbital elements. It orbits the Sun in the outer asteroid belt at a distance of 2.5–3.8 AU once every 5 years and 6 months (2,012 days; semi-major axis of 3.12 AU). Its orbit has an eccentricity of 0.21 and an inclination of 16° with respect to the ecliptic. The body's observation arc begins at Heidelberg on 8 August 1923, just two days after its official discovery observation.

Naming 

This minor planet was named after Johann Elert Bode (1747–1826), German astronomer, author of the Berliner Astronomisches Jahrbuch, known for the empirical Titius–Bode law about the sequence of planetary distances. Bode also was the director of the Berlin Observatory in 1780. The asteroid's name was proposed by Swedish astronomer Bror Asplind (see citation for ). The official  was mentioned in The Names of the Minor Planets by Paul Herget in 1955. The lunar crater Bode is also named in his honor.

Physical characteristics 

Bodea is an assumed C-type asteroid. Due to its very low albedo of 0.03 or less, it could also be a P- or D-type asteroid which are very common in the outer asteroid belt and among the Jupiter trojan population.

Rotation period 

In September 2006, a rotational lightcurve of Bodea was obtained from photometric observations by Italian astronomers Roberto Crippa and Federico Manzini at the Sozzago Astronomical Station . Lightcurve analysis gave a well defined rotation period of  hours with a relatively high brightness amplitude of  magnitude, which is indicative of an elongated, irregular shape.

Poles 

Modeled photometric data from the Lowell Photometric Database (LPD) and WISE thermal data, gave a concurring sidereal rotation period of 8.57412 hours. Each modeled lightcurve also determined the object's spin axes. Durech gives only one pole, namely (7.0°, −59.0°), while Hanus determined two lower rated poles at (336.0°, −70.0°) and (72.0°, −56.0°) in ecliptic coordinates (λ, β).

Diameter and albedo 

The Collaborative Asteroid Lightcurve Link adopts an albedo of 0.0304 and derives a diameter of 38.23 kilometers based on an absolute magnitude of 11.5.

Notes

References

External links 
 Lightcurve Database Query (LCDB), at www.minorplanet.info
 Dictionary of Minor Planet Names, Google books
 Asteroids and comets rotation curves, CdR – Geneva Observatory, Raoul Behrend
 Discovery Circumstances: Numbered Minor Planets (1)-(5000) – Minor Planet Center
 
 

000998
Discoveries by Karl Wilhelm Reinmuth
Named minor planets
19230806

vec:Lista de asteroidi#998 Bodea